Frigyes Riesz (sometimes spelled as Frederic; 22 January 1880 – 28 February 1956) was a Hungarian mathematician who made fundamental contributions to functional analysis, as did his younger brother Marcel Riesz.

Life and career 
He was born into a Jewish family in Győr, Austria-Hungary and died in Budapest, Hungary. Between 1911 and 1919 he was a professor at the Franz Joseph University in Kolozsvár, Austria-Hungary.  The post-WW1 Treaty of Trianon transferred former Austro-Hungarian territory including Kolozsvár to the Kingdom of Romania, whereupon Kolozsvár's name changed to Cluj and the University of Kolozsvár moved to Szeged, Hungary, becoming the University of Szeged.  Then, Riesz was the rector and a professor at the University of Szeged, as well as a member of the Hungarian Academy of Sciences. and the Polish Academy of Learning. He was the older brother of the mathematician Marcel Riesz.

Riesz did some of the fundamental work in developing functional analysis and his work has had a number of important applications in physics. He established the spectral theory for bounded symmetric operators in a form very much like that now regarded as standard.  He also made many contributions to other areas including ergodic theory, topology and he gave an elementary proof of the mean ergodic theorem.

Riesz founded the Acta Scientiarum Mathematicarum journal together with Alfréd Haar.

He had an uncommon method of giving lectures: he entered the lecture hall with an assistant and a docent. The docent then began reading the proper passages from Riesz's handbook and the assistant wrote the appropriate equations on the blackboard—while Riesz himself stood aside, nodding occasionally.

The Swiss-American mathematician Edgar Lorch spent 1934 in Szeged working under Riesz and wrote a reminiscence about his time there, including his collaboration with Riesz.

The corpus of his bibliography was compiled by the mathematician Pál Medgyessy.

Publications

See also 
Proximity space
Rising sun lemma
Denjoy–Riesz theorem
F. and M. Riesz theorem
Riesz representation theorem
Riesz-Fischer theorem
Riesz groups
Riesz's lemma
Riesz projector
Riesz sequence
Riesz space
Radon-Riesz property

References

External links 

 
 

1880 births
1956 deaths
Academic staff of the University of Szeged
19th-century Hungarian mathematicians
20th-century Hungarian mathematicians
Mathematical analysts
Functional analysts
Operator theorists
Mathematicians from Budapest
Members of the Hungarian Academy of Sciences
Burials at Kerepesi Cemetery
Academic staff of Franz Joseph University
Rectors of the Franz Joseph University
Austro-Hungarian mathematicians